Sebastian Vettel (born 3 July 1987) is a German racing driver who competed in Formula One from 2007 to 2022 for BMW Sauber, Toro Rosso, Red Bull, Ferrari, and Aston Martin. Vettel holds the record for being the youngest World Champion in Formula One. He also has the third-most race victories (53) and podium finishes (122), and fourth-most pole positions (57).

In 2013, he set the record for the most consecutive race wins with nine.

Early and personal life
Vettel was born on 3 July 1987 in Heppenheim, West Germany, to Norbert and Heike Vettel. He has one younger brother, Fabian, a racing driver, and two older sisters: Melanie, a dental technician, and Stefanie, a physiotherapist for disabled children. Vettel suggested in an interview that he was "terrible" at school, but he passed his Abitur at Heppenheim's  with a respectable grade. His childhood heroes were "The three Michaels": Michael Schumacher, Michael Jordan and Michael Jackson. He mentioned that he wanted to be a singer like Jackson, but realised that he did not have the voice. Vettel is also a fan of the Beatles, collecting several records, including Abbey Road and his favourite song being "Drive My Car". In an interview on Top Gear, he stated that he is a fan of British comedy such as Little Britain and Monty Python's Life of Brian. Vettel lives in Thurgovia, Switzerland, amongst other racing drivers and is a fan of German football team Eintracht Frankfurt. Vettel has described himself as competitive, private and impatient. He also appeared in advertisements for Head & Shoulders, and provided the voice of character Sebastian Schnell in the German dub of the 2011 film Cars 2, and a voice command assistant in the German and Italian dubs of the 2017 film Cars 3.

Vettel married childhood friend Hanna Prater at a private ceremony in early 2019, and they have three children. In 2016, Forbes estimated that his annual income was $41 million. Kimi Räikkönen, his teammate from 2015 to 2018, is a close friend. Besides his native German, Vettel speaks English, French, Finnish and Italian. In July 2022, he created his Instagram account, having long eschewed social media. Vettel's first Instagram post was to announce his retirement from Formula One at the end of the 2022 season.

Early career
Vettel began karting at the age of three, and began racing in karts series in 1995 at the age of eight. He was accepted into the Red Bull Junior Team in 1998, and won various titles, such as the Junior Monaco Kart Cup in 2001. Vettel was promoted to open-wheel cars in 2003, and was given a chance by Derrick Walker to test a Reynard Motorsport Champ Car in a two-day private test at the Homestead road course. A year later, he won the 2004 Formula BMW ADAC championship with 18 victories from 20 races.

Vettel drove for ASL Mücke Motorsport in the 2005 Formula 3 Euro Series. He was placed fifth in the final standings with 63 points and won the Rookie Cup. He tested for the Williams Formula One team later that year as a reward for his Formula BMW success. Vettel then went on to test for the BMW Sauber Formula One team.

Vettel was promoted to test driver for BMW Sauber in 2006, and participated in the 2006 Formula 3 Euro Series, finishing as runner-up. He also competed in the 2006 Formula Renault 3.5 Series, where he finished first and second at Misano in his first two races. In the next round at Spa-Francorchamps, his finger was almost sliced off by flying debris following an accident, and he was expected to be out for several weeks. Nevertheless, he managed to compete in the 2006 Masters of Formula 3 at Zandvoort the following weekend, where he finished in sixth place.

Vettel competed in the 2007 Formula Renault 3.5 Series, and took his first win at the Nürburgring. He led the championship when he was called up permanently by the BMW Sauber Formula One team.

Formula One career

BMW Sauber (2006–2007)

Test driver and debut 
Vettel became BMW Sauber's third driver at the 2006 Turkish Grand Prix, when former incumbent Robert Kubica replaced Jacques Villeneuve as second driver for the 2006 Hungarian Grand Prix. On his testing debut, Vettel set the fastest time in the second Friday free practice. Vettel became the then-youngest Formula One driver to participate in a Grand Prix weekend at 19 years and 53 days. He also set a record for collecting his first fine in nine seconds into his career, as Vettel exceeded the pitlane speed limit on the way to the track. In his second testing session at the 2006 Italian Grand Prix, he set the fastest time in both Friday practice sessions.

Following Kubica's crash at the 2007 Canadian Grand Prix, Vettel was named his replacement at the 2007 United States Grand Prix. He started in seventh position and finished in eighth to become the then-youngest driver to score a point in Formula One.

Toro Rosso (2007–2008)

Youngest polesitter and first race win 

BMW released him in July 2007 to join Red Bull's Scuderia Toro Rosso, replacing Scott Speed from the 2007 Hungarian Grand Prix onwards, as Vettel was already under contract to Red Bull Racing. It was also announced that he would drive for Toro Rosso in  alongside Sébastien Bourdais.

In the rain-affected  at Fuji, Vettel worked his way up to third, behind Lewis Hamilton and Red Bull Racing's Mark Webber, and seemed to be on course for his and the team's maiden podium finish. However, Vettel crashed into Webber under safety car conditions, forcing both cars to retire. Webber said after the race: "It's kids isn't it. Kids with not enough experience – you do a good job and then they fuck it all up". Vettel was initially punished with a ten-place grid penalty for the following race, but this was lifted after a spectator video on YouTube showed the incident may have been caused by Hamilton's behaviour behind the safety car.

He was tipped by Red Bull owner Dietrich Mateschitz as one of the sport's big future stars: "Vettel is one of the young guys with extraordinary potential [...] He is fast, he is intelligent, and he is very interested in the technical side."

After four races of the  season, Vettel was the only driver to have failed to finish a single race, having retired on the first lap in three of them. It made a huge difference – not only to the speed he could unlock but also to his ability to do so consistently."

At the wet , Vettel became the youngest driver in history to win a Formula One Grand Prix, aged 21 years and 74 days. He led for the majority of the Grand Prix and crossed the finish line 12.5 seconds ahead of McLaren's Heikki Kovalainen. It would also be Toro Rosso's only win. Earlier in the weekend, he had already become the youngest pole-sitter. Toro Rosso team boss Gerhard Berger said: "As he proved today, he can win races, but he's going to win World Championships. He's a cool guy". His victory led the German media to dub him "Baby Schumi".

Vettel was named 2008 Rookie of the Year at the Autosport Awards.

Red Bull (2009–2014)

2009–2010: Championship runner-up and youngest world champion 

At the start of the  season, Vettel replaced the retired David Coulthard at Red Bull Racing. However, a clash with Robert Kubica over second place in the latter stages forced both to retire.

Further wins followed in Great Britain, Japan and Abu Dhabi. He won the Japanese Grand Prix from pole position, leading every lap. Vettel won the inaugural Abu Dhabi Grand Prix, the first ever day-night race, to finish second in the World Drivers' Championship standings behind Jenson Button. He also scored his third fastest lap of the year, drawing him level with teammate Mark Webber. However, as Vettel had more second fastest laps, he won the 2009 DHL Fastest Lap Award.

He led most of the race but as a result of a spark plug failure, Vettel finished in fourth place. He took his first win of the season in Malaysia.

In Monaco, Vettel made it a Red Bull 1–2 with him second and Webber first. Both were equal on points in the standings, with Webber first based on total wins. The two collided, putting Vettel out of the race, with neither driver accepting responsibility for the collision.

Vettel's wing was damaged in the third practice session, and Webber's sole surviving example was removed and given to his teammate. Vettel qualified in first place, but suffered a puncture. He finished seventh while Webber took the victory. In Japan, he qualified on pole ahead of Webber and went on to win with a lights-to-flag victory. Aged 23 years and 98 days, Vettel became the youngest Grand Prix driver to win at the same track on two occasions. At the inaugural , Vettel led the first 45 laps before retiring with engine failure, handing victory to championship rival Fernando Alonso.

Vettel went into the final race of the season in Abu Dhabi with a 15-point deficit to Alonso and a 7-point gap to Webber. He won the Grand Prix from pole to become the youngest World Drivers' Champion in the sport's history, as Alonso only finished in seventh place.

2011–2012: Successful title defences, most poles in a season 

Vettel started the  season with wins in Australia and Malaysia, before a second-place finish at the  due to poor tyre management, possibly related to his inability to properly communicate with his team, as his radio was broken. In Monaco, Vettel led the race but due to another radio malfunction, the Red Bull pit crew was not prepared when he came in. The pit stop was slow and he was sent out on the wrong tyres, handing the lead to Button. Vettel switched to a one-stop strategy and stuck with one set of soft tyres for 56 laps. He was caught by Alonso and Button as his tyres deteriorated, but neither were able to pass him. The race was red-flagged with few laps remaining, which allowed teams to change their tyres; when the race was restarted under the safety car, Vettel was able to retain the lead and win.

It was believed by some in the press that this was an attempt by the FIA to thwart Vettel's early domination. Nevertheless, he took pole with the fastest qualifying lap in Valencia Street Circuit's history. Vettel dominated with his first hat-trick of 2011, and won his sixth race out of eight. Red Bull believed the changes would cost them about half a second per lap. During the race, Vettel held off Webber for second place, who ignored a radio message from team principal Christian Horner to hold position. It was only the second time in the sport's history that a driver had finished second or higher in each of the first nine races of a season and won at least six of them.

Vettel's run of fourteen successive front-row starts and eleven successive top two finishes ended at his home race, where he qualified third and finished fourth. In Italy, he took his tenth pole position of the year, in which he joined Ayrton Senna as the only driver to have taken ten pole positions in two separate seasons. A podium finish in Japan secured his second successive title with four races remaining, making him the youngest ever double and back-to-back champion. Vettel won the following race in Korea to become the second driver to take at least ten wins in a season after Michael Schumacher. He also helped to secure Red Bull's second successive World Constructors' Championship. Vettel took his eleventh victory of the season in the inaugural Indian Grand Prix, leading every lap from pole position, as well as setting the race's fastest lap to claim his first grand slam. Vettel broke the record for the most pole positions in a season at the season finale in Brazil, after he clinched his 15th pole of the year. He completed the year with 15 poles, 11 victories, and 17 podiums from 19 races; Vettel also earned a record total of 392 points.

Vettel and Horner criticised Karthikeyan's driving, with Vettel calling him an "idiot", and a "cucumber". Karthikeyan hit back, calling Vettel a "cry baby". Three races without a podium place followed, before he retired at the  after an alternator failure, dropping him to fourth in the standings. In Germany, Vettel finished second behind Alonso but received a 20-second time penalty after the race, as he was off the track when he overtook Button; Vettel dropped back to fifth. He started in 10th place but finished second in Belgium to climb up to second place in the championship. Vettel then retired at the  due to an alternator failure, which saw the gap to leader Alonso grow to 39 points with seven races remaining. He won next race in Singapore, as he kept the lead until the 2-hour race limit was reached. At the  he took his second career grand slam and coupled with Alonso's retirement, he cut the gap down to just four points.

From last place, Vettel fought his way back to finish in third place. He started the last race in Brazil with a 13-point cushion against Alonso. On the opening lap, Vettel spun after an incident with Bruno Senna. Following changing weather conditions, Vettel climbed up to finish in sixth place to win the championship by three points and to become the youngest ever triple world champion. He also became the third driver to acquire three consecutive championships, after Juan Manuel Fangio and Schumacher.

2013–2014: Quadruple world champion, nine wins in a row, and departure from Red Bull 

He won the race, though not without controversy. Vettel ignored the team orders and passed Webber for the lead. Webber was furious after the race and said that Vettel "will have protection as usual and that's the way it goes". Team principal Horner, although unhappy with Vettel's actions, pointed out that Webber had defied team orders on several previous occasions. He acknowledged that the already fragile relationship between the two drivers had further broken down as a result of the incident. Vettel claimed that he was not sorry for winning and that if the situation presented itself again, he would have passed Webber despite the order, adding that he felt Webber did not deserve to win the race.

Vettel bounced back to win his home race in Germany for the first time. After he finished third in Hungary, Vettel won the last nine races of the season, including grand slams in Singapore and Korea. Vettel set the record for most consecutive race wins with nine and he became only the third man after Alberto Ascari and Jim Clark to take consecutive grand slams.

On several occasions during the season, spectators booed Vettel. Although the booing was widely condemned by fellow drivers, the media and others in the paddock, Vettel revealed that it had a negative impact on him.

For the  season and beyond, drivers picked a unique car number to use for the remainder of their Formula One career; Vettel chose the number five. However, as reigning World Drivers' Champion, he carried number one throughout the season. Webber left the sport and was replaced by Daniel Ricciardo, who was promoted from Toro Rosso.

Vettel struggled with reliability issues throughout winter testing, which forced him to retire at the opening . Reliability problems also forced Vettel to retire at the Monaco and Austrian Grands Prix. Vettel qualified on the front-row for the races in Malaysia, Great Britain and Hungary, and finished on the podium in Malaysia, Canada, Singapore and Japan. In addition to suffering reliability problems, throughout 2014 Vettel struggled to get to grips with the Red Bull RB10, and the Pirelli tyres.

In October, Red Bull had announced that Vettel would be leaving the team at the end of the season to join Scuderia Ferrari, one year before his contract was due to expire. Vettel replaced Alonso and partnered his friend Kimi Räikkönen. Vettel mentioned he would like to drive for Ferrari at some point in his career and was already rumoured in 2012 to have a non-binding pre-contract, with options, to join them in 2014. He was denied an early release from his Red Bull contract to test the 2014 Ferrari car in Abu Dhabi. In spite of this, Vettel was present at the Ferrari test – although not driving the car – but Red Bull did not enforce any sanctions. Vettel instead made his first appearance in November, completing nearly 100 laps in the 2012 car around the test track of Fiorano.

Ferrari (2015–2020)

2015–2016: Returning to the top step, a threat to Mercedes 

After the race, an emotional Vettel paid tribute to Schumacher, saying that his hero's achievements with Ferrari made the first win all the more special.

He dedicated his victory to the driver Jules Bianchi, who died the week prior from injuries sustained in 2014. At the halfway point of the season, Vettel was 42 points behind championship leader and Mercedes driver Hamilton. Vettel was in third place in Belgium when his right rear blew at high speed on the penultimate lap, likely ending any title chances given Hamilton's win. After the race, he ranted about the 'unacceptable' and 'unsafe' Pirelli tyres that could have caused him serious injury.

He then took his first pole with the team at the Singapore Grand Prix, Ferrari's first pole for three years. Vettel went on to win the race, and with Hamilton retiring, he closed to within 49 points with seven races remaining. Vettel ended the season in third place, however, with three wins and 13 podiums; he declared the season as a 'miracle'.

After a third-place finish at the 2016 Australian Grand Prix, Vettel's participation in Bahrain ended without starting as his car broke down on the formation lap. He blamed Red Bull driver Daniil Kvyat for the collision, labelling him a "madman" and described his overtaking manoeuvre as "suicidal". Vettel then blocked Red Bull's Ricciardo by moving in the braking zone, and was given a ten-second penalty and two points on his licence. Although he achieved seven podium finishes during the season, Vettel did not win any races in 2016.

2017–2018: Championship challenges ending in disappointment 

His third season at Ferrari started with victory in Australia, his first in 18 months. The early form continued the following races, winning in Bahrain and Monaco, and finishing second in China, Russia and Spain. In Russia, Vettel took his first pole position in 18 months and with Räikkönen alongside him, Ferrari had their first front row lock out since the 2008 French Grand Prix. Vettel's lead at the top of the standings increased to 25 points after the Monaco Grand Prix, Ferrari's first victory at the circuit since Schumacher won there in 2001.

In Azerbaijan, Vettel collided into the rear of race leader Hamilton under the safety car, accusing Hamilton of brake testing him. Moments later, Vettel pulled alongside and hit his Mercedes as they prepared for a restart, for which he received a ten-second stop-go penalty. The FIA investigated the Vettel-Hamilton incident further, but Vettel received no punishment. Vettel took full responsibility, issuing a public apology and committing to devote personal time over the next 12 months to educational activities across a variety of FIA championships and events.

Vettel's championship lead was cut to only a single point in Great Britain, as he suffered a puncture on the penultimate lap and dropped to seventh place. Vettel started from pole in Hungary, and maintained the lead. He overcame steering issues and held on for victory, which gave him a 14-point lead over Hamilton. Mercedes dominated after the summer break and Vettel lost the championship lead at the Italian Grand Prix, which was followed by a first-lap retirement in Singapore after collision with Räikkönen and Verstappen. It was the first time in Formula One history that both Ferraris retired from the first lap of a Grand Prix. His title hopes were dealt another blow in Malaysia, as he started last following a turbo problem in qualifying. He finished in fourth place, but crashed with Williams' Lance Stroll on the cool-down lap; neither would be penalised. More reliability issues befell Ferrari in Japan as Vettel retired due to a spark plug failure. In Mexico, Vettel became the fourth driver in Formula One history to claim 50 pole positions. Verstappen took the lead from Vettel at the start, before Vettel collided with Hamilton, after which Hamilton won his fourth title. For the first time in his career, Vettel failed to win the World Drivers' Championship having led it at some stage during a season.

The  season was dubbed the "Fight For Five" by the media, as for the first time in Formula One history, two quadruple world champions lined up at the start of a season. For the second consecutive year, Vettel began the season with victory in Australia, after he took the lead while pitting under the virtual safety car. It was his 100th podium, while he also became only the third man in Formula One history to have led 3,000 laps. In Bahrain, Vettel maintained the lead from pole through the first round of pit stops and held off Mercedes' Valtteri Bottas despite being on old soft tyres to take a fourth victory at the circuit. Vettel limped home in eighth place, with his championship lead reduced to nine points. For the first time since 2013, Vettel took three consecutive pole positions as he qualified in first place in Azerbaijan. It was the 23rd different Grand Prix at which he had taken pole position, equalling Hamilton's record.

The following race in France, Vettel lost the championship lead following a collision with Bottas. He bounced back in Great Britain, after he passed Bottas in the last laps to take victory. Vettel led his home race until he slid off the track and hit the wall in the latter stages as rain started to fall, as he had clipped the sausage curb a few laps before, breaking a part of his front wing, causing understeer and loss of downforce; he won in Belgium, however, in which he passed Hamilton for the race victory. Contact on the opening lap with Hamilton in Italy saw Vettel damage his front wing and drop to the back of the field, but he recovered to cross the finishing line in fourth place. It left Vettel 30 points behind the Mercedes driver with seven races left. His championship hopes were dealt a further blow as Ferrari's upgrades introduced at the Singapore Grand Prix proved to be unsuccessful, making a step backwards on car development; Ferrari suffered a dip of form until the United States Grand Prix, where they reverted to their old package and successfully rediscovered their form. Vettel claimed his first ever podium in Mexico but the World Drivers' Championship went to Hamilton for a second consecutive year. Although Mercedes had been the more consistent and better team, fans and pundits criticised Vettel for making too many mistakes during the season.

2019–2020: Difficult ending at Ferrari 
After showing impressive pace throughout pre-season testing in Barcelona, Vettel and his new teammate Charles Leclerc headed to Australia with many pundits believing they had the car to beat for the  season. The opening weekend proved to be difficult, however, as Vettel qualified some seven tenths off pole position in third and finished the race in fourth place. Third-place finishes in China and Azerbaijan followed, as Mercedes continued to dominate. Vettel took pole position in Canada; his first pole in 17 races. Midway through the race, a snap of oversteer caused him to run wide onto the grass. Vettel received a five-second time penalty from the stewards, who believed he had returned to the track "in an unsafe manner and forced [Hamilton] off track". Vettel crossed the line in first place but lost his victory as a result of the penalty. After the race, he swapped the number one and two signs in front of Hamilton's Mercedes and the empty spot that was supposed for his own car, as Vettel parked his car at the start of the pit entry. During a race with mixed weather conditions, Vettel climbed up to second place. In Italy, Vettel spun at the Ascari chicane and when he re-entered the track, he made contact with Racing Point's Stroll. Vettel received a 10-second stop-go penalty and finished in 13th place. For the first time, Vettel had won five times at the same track. The following race, in Russia, Vettel went from third place on the grid to first place in the first corner. However, radio transmissions suggested that the team wanted to swap their drivers, but with Vettel the quicker driver, he remained in front. Vettel retired soon after with a MGU-K problem.

Vettel took pole position in Japan, but an abrupt start off the line caused him to momentarily stop before getting away, which allowed Bottas to take the lead; Vettel was not penalized for his jump start. He tried to pass his teammate immediately but the two Ferraris collided, resulting in another retirement for Vettel. He finished fifth in the World Drivers' Championship, and was outscored by a teammate for only the second time across a season.

Ferrari later announced they would not extend Vettel's contract beyond the  season. Team principal Mattia Binotto explained there was "no specific reason" for the decision, though both parties noted it was an amicable agreement. The season was disrupted by the COVID-19 pandemic as the first ten races of the original calendar were either rescheduled, postponed or cancelled altogether. Ferrari discovered problems on their car following pre-season testing, forcing them to make a major redesign.

The SF1000 lacked pace as Vettel finished the season's opening race in Austria in 10th place. During the weekend, he was also given a warning for breaching the FIA's COVID-19 protocols after he was seen mixing with members of his former team Red Bull. He ended the season in a disappointing 13th place in the Drivers' standings, with a third place in Turkey as his best result. Ferrari only finished sixth in the Constructors' standings, their worst result since 1980, while Vettel's total of 33 points was the lowest in a full campaign in his Formula One career.

Aston Martin (2021–2022) 

Vettel joined Aston Martin for the 2021 season, replacing Sergio Pérez. In his debut race weekend in Bahrain, he received a grid penalty in qualifying, forcing him to start last. While Vettel started well, he had a collision with Esteban Ocon, giving him a time penalty and ended up finishing in 15th place. He received five penalty points on his superlicence. Aston Martin team principal Otmar Szafnauer reported no concerns, owing to this being a very different car from the Ferrari, lack of laps in pre-season testing and a very impressive race start. In the fifth race of the season, Vettel scored his first points for the team with a fifth-place finish in Monaco. At the following race, the Azerbaijan Grand Prix, he claimed Aston Martin's first podium with a second-place finish. Vettel also finished second in Hungary, but was later disqualified, after his car failed to provide the one litre sample of fuel required. He ended the season in 12th place in the Drivers' standings, ahead of teammate Stroll. During the season, Vettel made 132 overtakes—the most of any driver—and won the inaugural Overtake Award.

Vettel missed the first two races of the 2022 season in Bahrain and Saudi Arabia after testing positive for COVID-19; he was substituted by Aston Martin's reserve driver Nico Hülkenberg. In July 2022, Vettel announced his retirement from Formula One at the end of the 2022 season.

Race of Champions

Vettel competed in the 2007 Race of Champions at Wembley Stadium, representing the German team alongside Michael Schumacher, winning the Nations' Cup title. He also teamed up with Schumacher from 2008 to 2012, winning the Cup on every occasion.

Vettel returned to the 2015 Race of Champions, representing Germany together with Nico Hülkenberg. He won his very first individual Race of Champions title that year, beating Tom Kristensen in the final. Vettel and Hülkenberg finished runner-up in the Nations Cup. In 2017, Vettel was eliminated in the first heat for the individual competition, but went on to win the Nations' Cup for Germany by himself with his seventh victory, after his teammate Pascal Wehrlein was injured earlier in a crash.

In the 2019 event, Vettel teamed up with Mick Schumacher, where they finished runners-up in the Nations' Cup to the Nordic team of Kristensen and Johan Kristoffersson. Vettel was eliminated in the group stages of the individual competition, although he won the ROC Skills Challenge. He reached the individual final in 2022 but was beaten by Sébastien Loeb.

Helmet design

From his karting days, Vettel worked with helmet designer Jens Munser. At the age of eight, Vettel wanted Sebastian the crab from The Little Mermaid on his helmet. Vettel's original helmet in Formula One, like most Red Bull-backed drivers, was heavily influenced by the energy drink company logo. New to Vettel's helmet at the start of 2008 was the incorporation of the red cross shape of the Kreis Bergstraße coat of arms on the front, just underneath the visor, in honour of the region of his birthplace, Heppenheim.

After switching to Red Bull in 2009, Vettel regularly used a variety of new helmet designs. Some designs were small changes to his original Red Bull design, while others were completely new designs, such as the one he used at the 2010 Japanese Grand Prix: Vettel had a special white-red helmet design, with black kanji and hiragana for "gives you wings". Several of his helmet designs also featured his team members. At the 2012 Italian Grand Prix, Vettel celebrated his 50th helmet design with a 'rusty' matte look and 50 tallies, indicating his 50 helmet designs in Formula One. Vettel started his 2013 campaign with a design in honour of Felix Baumgartner, for his world record Red Bull Stratos space jump in October 2012. By the end of the 2013 season, he had used 76 different helmet designs throughout his career.

For the 2017 Italian Grand Prix he changed the German flag stripe on his helmet to an Italian flag stripe in celebration of Ferrari's home race. Following the death of Niki Lauda, Vettel wore a special helmet based on Lauda's final Ferrari helmet at the 2019 Monaco Grand Prix.

Car names
Inspired by American bomber pilots in the Second World War, Vettel has made it a tradition to name his cars. He said: "It's important to have a close relationship with a car. Like a ship, a car should be named after a girl as it's sexy". The car he drove for his first full season in 2008, the Toro Rosso STR3, was named Julie, followed by Kate and Kate's Dirty Sister (2009), Luscious Liz and Randy Mandy (2010), Kinky Kylie (2011), Abbey (2012) and Hungry Heidi (2013). Vettel continued this tradition with Ferrari and christened his 2015 Ferrari SF15-T Eva, followed by Margherita (2016) Gina (2017), Loria (2018), Lina (2019), and Lucilla (2020). In 2021, he named his Aston Martin AMR21 car after Honey Ryder, a character from the James Bond film, Dr. No.

Comparison to Michael Schumacher

Vettel's unexpected win at the 2008 Italian Grand Prix led the media to dub him the "Baby Schumi". He was not just dubbed this for his nationality but also because of his driving style, his concentration and the hands-on role he plays behind the scenes with his team of engineers. Vettel played down the comparison stating he wanted to be the "New Vettel".

Nevertheless, the similarities were marked. Like Schumacher, Vettel grew up in a small town with an everyday background—Schumacher's father is a bricklayer and Vettel's is a carpenter. Both had their first taste of racing at the Kerpen karting track near Cologne, not far from the Nürburgring. Vettel began driving in his garden lapping the garden many times before he could legally take to the roads, and said his passion for cars was nurtured by watching Schumacher compete.

After winning his first championship in 2010, and being hailed as the "Next Schumacher", Vettel stated he did not want to aim for Schumacher's record after learning how hard it was to get one championship under his belt, though he would like to win more. In 2011, Pirelli director Paul Hembery was impressed when Vettel was the only driver to take the time to visit the factory and talk to the tyre manufacturer to gain a better insight. "The only other driver that asks us a lot of questions is Michael Schumacher. It is like seeing the master and the protégé at work."

After Schumacher was severely injured in a skiing accident in late 2013, Vettel was on hand to collect the Millennium-Bambi Award for Schumacher's life achievements on his behalf in 2014. In 2014, Vettel cited Schumacher as one of his inspirations in becoming a Scuderia Ferrari driver: "When I was a kid, Michael Schumacher in the red car was my greatest idol and now it's an incredible honour to finally get the chance to drive a Ferrari."

Activism
Vettel has demonstrated an interest in the environment and other social justice issues. Following the 2021 British Grand Prix, he helped remove litter from the stands, and he also worked with children in Austria to build a hotel for bees. Furthermore, Vettel has been critical of how F1 races are scheduled, stating that races that are geographically proximate to each other should be held on consecutive weekends to reduce emissions from travelling. He also held an all-women karting event during the weekend of the 2021 Saudi Arabian Grand Prix, and wore the pride flag at the 2021 Hungarian Grand Prix despite being reprimanded. Following the 2022 Russian invasion of Ukraine, Vettel expressed an intent to boycott the September's Russian Grand Prix had the race gone ahead as planned.

In May 2022, he appeared on the BBC One political topical debate programme Question Time to discuss a variety of issues including climate change, energy dependency, and Brexit. The following month, Vettel appeared on the cover of Attitude, voicing support for an LGBTQ driver competing in Formula One. In June 2022, while participating in the Canadian Grand Prix, Vettel denounced Canada's mining of the Alberta oil sands by wearing a T-shirt and helmet patch calling it "Canada's climate crime". Alberta Premier Jason Kenney called it "over-the-top hypocrisy" because Vettel's team, Aston Martin, is sponsored by petroleum company Saudi Aramco, which he said has "one of the worst climate-emissions records in the world". Vettel agreed with the "hypocritical" label but said those personal attacks risk missing what he called the "bigger picture" of the climate crisis.

Honours
Vettel was named Rookie of the Year at the 2008 Autosport Awards. In 2009, Vettel was awarded the Lorenzo Bandini Trophy, for his achievements in the 2008 season. He was also awarded the 2009 British Racing Drivers' Club Johnny Wakefield Trophy for "setting the fastest race lap of the season on the Silverstone Grand Prix Circuit". In 2010, Vettel was voted German Sportspersonality of the Year and won the Autosport International Racing Driver Award, which he also won in the following three years. In January 2012, Vettel was honoured with the Grands Prix de l'Academie des Sports, and in February, he was further honoured with the Silbernes Lorbeerblatt, in recognition of his world titles and his "exemplary character". Vettel was voted Formula One driver of the year in 2009, 2011 and 2013 by the team principals, initiated by the Autosport magazine. He additionally won the DHL Fastest Lap Award in 2009, 2012 and 2013. He was named European Sportsperson of the Year by the International Sports Press Association in 2010, and by the Polish Press Agency in 2012 and 2013. Furthermore, Vettel was named the BBC Overseas Sports Personality of the Year in 2013. He was named Sportsman of the Year at the 2014 Laureus World Sports Awards. In 2015, he received the Confartigianato Motori Award for Driver of the Year. After retiring from Formula One in 2022, Vettel received the Autosport Gregor Grant Award for his "achievement in motorsport".

Red Bull Racing sponsor Infiniti released a Sebastian Vettel edition of the Infiniti FX SUV for 2012. It featured increased engine power, revised bodywork and lower suspension than the standard model.

Karting record

Karting career summary

Racing record

Racing career summary

Complete Formula BMW ADAC results
(key) (Races in bold indicate pole position, races in italics indicate fastest lap)

Complete Formula 3 Euro Series results
(key) (Races in bold indicate pole position, races in italics indicate fastest lap)

Complete Formula Renault 3.5 Series results
(key) (Races in bold indicate pole position, races in italics indicate fastest lap)

Complete Formula One results

(key) (Races in bold indicate pole position; races in italics indicate fastest lap)

 Did not finish, but was classified as he had completed more than 90% of the race distance.
 Half points awarded as less than 75% of race distance was completed.

Formula One records
Vettel holds the following Formula One records:

Footnotes

See also
 List of Formula One Grand Prix wins by Sebastian Vettel

References

External links

 
 
 Profile – from BBC F1
 

1987 births
Formula BMW ADAC drivers
Formula One race winners
Formula One World Drivers' Champions
World Series Formula V8 3.5 drivers
Formula 3 Euro Series drivers
German Formula One drivers
German racing drivers
German expatriate sportspeople in Switzerland
Living people
People from Bergstraße (district)
Sportspeople from Darmstadt (region)
Racing drivers from Hesse
Sauber Formula One drivers
Toro Rosso Formula One drivers
Red Bull Formula One drivers
Euroformula Open Championship drivers
Recipients of the Silver Laurel Leaf
Ferrari Formula One drivers
Laureus World Sports Awards winners
BBC Sports Personality World Sport Star of the Year winners
Aston Martin Formula One drivers
 
Eifelland Racing drivers
Mücke Motorsport drivers
ART Grand Prix drivers
Carlin racing drivers
Racing Engineering drivers